The Bouleț is a right tributary of the river Cracăul Alb in Romania. It starts at the confluence of headwaters Boulețul Mare and Boulețul Mic. It flows into the Cracăul Alb in Mitocu Bălan.

References

Maps
 Harta turistică, Parcul Vânători-Neamț 

Rivers of Romania
Rivers of Neamț County